Šarani is a village in the municipality of Gornji Milanovac, Serbia. According to the 2011 census, the village has a population of 241 people.

The name Savinac is often identified with the village of Šarani. Savinac is a wider land area on the left bank of the Dičina River.

References 

Populated places in Moravica District